Horror may refer to:

Arts, entertainment, and media

Genres 
Horror fiction, a genre of fiction
Japanese horror, Japanese horror fiction
Korean horror, Korean horror fiction
Horror film, a film genre
Indonesian horror
Thai horror
Horror comics, comic books focusing on horror
Horror punk, a music genre
Horrorcore, a subgenre of hip hop music based on horror
Horror game, a video game genre
Survival horror, a video game subgenre of horror and action-adventure
Horror podcast, a podcast genre

Films
Horror (2002 film), an American film by Dante Tomaselli
#Horror, a 2015 American film by Tara Subkoff
Horror, Italian title for the 1963 Italian-Spanish film The Blancheville Monster

Fictional characters
Horror (Garo), fictional monsters in the tokusatsu series 
Horror icon, a significant person or fictional character in a horror genre

Music

Groups and labels
 Ho99o9 (pronounced Horror), an American hip hop group
 The Horrors, an English rock band

Albums and EPs
 Horror (Cannae album), 2003
 Horror (With Blood Comes Cleansing album), 2008
 The Horror, a 2003 album by RJD2
 The Horrors (EP), 2006 EP by the Horrors
 Horror, a 2019 album by Exhumed

Other arts, entertainment, and media
Horror and terror, two concepts in Gothic literature and film
 Horror Channel, a former name of the British television channel Legend
"The horror! The horror!", a line uttered by Kurtz in Joseph Conrad's 1899 novella Heart of Darkness and its 1979 film adaptation Apocalypse Now

Other uses
 "The horrors", a nickname for delirium tremens, or, acute delirium caused by alcohol withdrawal

See also
Horror vacui (disambiguation)